
Chillwa Quta, also spelled Chillhua Kkota, is a lake in the Kimsa Cruz mountain range in the Andes of Bolivia. It is situated in the La Paz Department, Loayza Province, Cairoma Municipality. Chillwa Quta lies south-west of the mountain Mama Uqllu, south of the lake Warus Quta and south-east of the mountain Taruja Umaña. This is where the river Taruj Umaña originates. It flows to the west and then to the north-west as an affluent of the La Paz River.

References 

Lakes of La Paz Department (Bolivia)